The Ringneck & Western Railroad (reporting mark RWRR), a subsidiary of Watco, is a railroad that began operations in late May 2021 over  of former Dakota Southern Railway track between Mitchell and Presho, South Dakota. The railroad was formed after Watco purchased the 189.7 miles (305.3 km) of track between Mitchell and Kadoka, South Dakota from the state of South Dakota in 2021. The line beyond Presho is out of service with the US Hwy 83 expressway crossing having been removed in the early 2000s during the years that the line was used only for car storage beyond Mitchell.

History
The line is part of a former Chicago, Milwaukee, St. Paul and Pacific Railroad (CMStP&P) secondary built between Marquette, Iowa and Rapid City, South Dakota between 1880 and 1907. The line lost profitability and was embargoed in 1980 and subsequently purchased by the South Dakota Department of Transportation, which sold the line to Watco in 2021 for $13,000,000. The Dakota Southern Railway, first under the ownership of brothers Alex and Dick Huff  and later Mike Williams and Stan Patterson, from the late 1980's to 2021 onward operated and between 2011 and 2016 rehabilitated the line as far as Presho.With Federal TIGER Grants plus State Funding. Track beyond Kadoka to Rapid City has been removed.

Traffic
According to Watco traffic consists mainly of grain, fertilizer, and paper products to or from the shuttle loading elevators near Presho, Kennebec, Kimball and a box factory in Mitchell. Interchange is made with BNSF in Mitchell.

References

2021 establishments in South Dakota
Railway companies established in 2021
South Dakota railroads